Irma Pany (born 15 July 1988), better known as Irma, is a Cameroonian singer-songwriter living in France.

Early life and education
She was born in Douala in a family with a scientific background. Her father is a biologist and her mother is a pharmacist.

As a child Irma was performing at masses too. At age 15, she went to a high school in Paris, France, to improve her school education.

In 2008, Irma entered ESCP Europe (Top French Business School) and graduated in the Master in Management in 2012.

Career

By 2007, she had posted her first videos on YouTube. Those included her own compositions, including "Letter to the Lord" and a piano piece "Somehow", as well as cover versions of songs including "I Want You Back" by The Jackson 5, "Bubbly" by Colbie Caillat, and "New Soul" by Yael Naim.

She released several home-made videos with acoustic covers on YouTube in collaboration with French and international musicians, including Tété ("Hey Ya!"), Matthieu Chédid ("Rolling in the Deep"), Gad Elmaleh ("Isn't She Lovely?"), Tom Dice ("Talkin' 'bout a Revolution") from Belgium and Patrice ("The Times They Are a-Changin'") from Germany. Together with will.i.am from the Black Eyed Peas, she performed a cover version of "I Want You Back".

In the summer of 2008, she met Michael Goldman (son of a French musician Jean-Jacques Goldman), who in 2007 co-founded the music label My Major Company. Irma signed a record deal with My Major Company and released her first album Letter to the Lord in February 2011 in France, where it peaked in the top ten and was certified platinum a year after the release. In Switzerland, she debuted at number 46 and in Wallonia, Belgium, at number 18. The first single "I Know" reached number two in France. The music video was directed and shot by J.G. Biggs.

In 2011, she went on tour around Europe and in late 2011, signed a record contract to release her debut album in the US with Universal Republic Records. In 2012, she was featured in a European Google Chrome ad which chronicles her rise to fame after posting videos on YouTube, and she was nominated for the best French act at the 2012 MTV Europe Music Awards. In early 2013, she re-released her successful single "I Know" as a duet for the German market with German singer-songwriter Mic Donet.

Irma's music video Save Me (directed by Xavier Maingon) won 2014 the "Starz People’s Choice Award" in the section Music Video at the 37th Starz Denver Film Festival.

Discography

Albums

Others
2012: Letter to the Lord (Special 'Collectors Edition')

Singles

*Did not appear in the official Belgian Ultratop 50 charts, but rather in the bubbling under Ultratip charts.

Others

Awards

|-
|rowspan="3"|2012
|Irma
|Talent Découverte France Bleu
|
|-
|Irma
|MTV European Music Awards – Best French Artist
|
|-
|Irma
|Victoires de la musique – Live discovery
|
|-
||2014
|Irma – Save me
|37th Denver Film Festival – Starz People's Choice Award for Music videos
|
|}

See also

Culture of Paris
List of blues musicians
List of folk musicians
List of My Major Company artists
List of Cameroonians
List of Republic Records artists
List of singer-songwriters
List of Universal Republic Records artists
Music of Cameroon
Music of France

References

External links

Irma et... Will.i.Am en duo sur "I Want You Back"
Profile at My Major Company
Profile at Doubleveeconcerts

1988 births
21st-century French women writers
Ballad musicians
Blues singer-songwriters
Cameroonian expatriates in France
21st-century Cameroonian women singers
English-language singers from France
Folk singers
Living people
Singers from Paris
People from Douala
Republic Records artists
Writers from Paris
21st-century French women singers
21st-century women composers